Daniela Mercury (also known as Swing da Cor) is the eponymous solo debut album by Brazilian singer, songwriter and record producer Daniela Mercury, released in 1991 in Brazil by independent record company Eldorado. The songs "Swing da Cor" and "Menino do Pelô", both recorded with Olodum, were released as singles and became major hits in Brazil. Eldorado re-released the album in 1997 under the name Swing da Cor and under its original title in 2006. The album went gold and sold more than 350.000 copies in Brazil.

Track listing

Personnel 

John T. Matarazzo – Executive Producer
Daniela Mercury – Vocals, Producer
Wesley Rangel – Producer

Awards
Prêmio Sharp - Award for best new artist (regional)

1991 albums
Daniela Mercury albums